Comeback sauce is a dipping sauce for fried foods or as a salad dressing in the cuisine of central Mississippi. Similar to Louisiana remoulade, the base of the sauce consists of mayonnaise and chili sauce (or some approximation of that combination). The origin has been credited to The Rotisserie, a Greek restaurant that was located in Jackson, Mississippi.

Several Jackson, Mississippi, restaurants serve their own variations of the sauce and many offer bottled comeback sauce.

See also

 Russian dressing
 Thousand Island dressing
 Fry sauce

References

External links

Recipe 

Sauces
Cuisine of the Southern United States